Postcards is an album by American musician Peter Ostroushko, released in 2006.

The songs on Postcards are culled from songs Ostroushko wrote for A Prairie Home Companion. With few exceptions, each piece is tied specifically to the location the show was visiting for that episode.

Reception

Ed Huyck of PopMatters wrote of the album "There is a certain familiarity to the songs, as if the tunes have been part of the American lexicon for decades. Ostroushko has studied hard through his career, and pulls together these different parts of traditional music—the ache of the blues and country, the stomp of traditional folk, the vibe of jazz—into a cohesive whole... Postcards does suffer from some of the usual instrumental album pitfalls. Though the musical styles are varied, the songs still tend to run into each other in the mind. If you want the album to be more than background music (and it really deserves that from the listener), it is best to listen to in small bursts."

Track listing 
All songs by Peter Ostroushko.
"Manassas Junction" – 3:39
"Baghdad Blues" – 3:31
"St. Augustine Lullaby" – 3:31
"Saturday Night Guys Cruising Van Nuys" – 3:11
"When the City of Angels Sleeps" – 3:45
"Dayton Cakewalk Delight" – 3:13
"Bemidji Blues" – 2:47
"Cashdollar's Berkshire Blues" – 3:45
"Tecumseh" – 3:46
"McCully's Waltz" – 4:54
"Montenegro" – 5:57
"Meditation on the Thin Space at St. Paul's Chapel"

Personnel
Peter Ostroushko – mandolin, fiddle, mandocello
Marc Anderson – percussion, hand percussion
Dan Chouinard – piano, accordion
Pat Donohue – guitar, slide guitar
Ruth Mackenzie – vocals, voices
Joel Sayles – bass
Diane Tremaine – cello

Production notes
Produced and mixed by Peter Ostroushko
Executive producer – Eric Peltoniemi
Engineered, mixed and mastered by Matthew Zimmerman
Photography by Ann Marsden and Dana Miller
Art direction and design by Carla Leighton

References

2006 albums
Peter Ostroushko albums
Red House Records albums